Walter Ronald Sewell (19 July 1890 – 4 February 1945) was an English professional footballer who played as a goalkeeper for Gainsborough Trinity, Burnley, Blackburn Rovers and England.

Life and career
Sewell was born in Middlesbrough. He began his football career with Gainsborough Trinity of the Football League Second Division, but did not appear for the first team, and spent the 1910–11 season with North-Eastern League club Wingate Albion. In the summer of 1911 he returned to Gainsborough Trinity on professional terms, and immediately became a regular member of their first team in what proved to be the club's final season in the Football League, missing only one of the 38 League matches.

The following season he joined Burnley, for whom he appeared in their 1914 FA Cup Final victory against Liverpool, although he never really established himself as a first-team regular in a Turf Moor career which was interrupted by the First World War. In all, he made a total of only 23 Football League appearances for Burnley over a seven-year period.

During the 1919–20 season he was transferred to near-neighbours Blackburn Rovers, where he remained until 1927 and where he enjoyed the best of his football career, making 227 Football League appearances for the club and winning one full international cap for England. The match, against Wales on 3 March 1924, was played at Blackburn's Ewood Park ground, and England lost 2–1.

After leaving Blackburn Rovers, Sewell re-joined Gainsborough Trinity and was a member of their Midland League championship-winning side of 1927–28. Whilst playing for Gainsborough in an away Midland League match against Doncaster Rovers Reserves on 9 March 1929, he sustained a hand injury that eventually prompted his retirement from football. By the time his playing days ended, he had become licensee of the Cattle Market Hotel in Lincoln.

Sewell died in Lincoln County Hospital in 1945 aged 54.

Honours
Burnley
FA Cup winners: 1914

References

1890 births
Footballers from Middlesbrough
1945 deaths
English footballers
England international footballers
Association football goalkeepers
Blackburn Rovers F.C. players
Burnley F.C. players
Gainsborough Trinity F.C. players
English Football League players
Burnley F.C. wartime guest players
FA Cup Final players